Margaret Viola Wigham (February 3, 1904 – April 17, 1972) was a composer, music educator and pianist, born in Minnesota. She was nationally known as a mid-century composer of student piano pieces. Her pieces often had an educational focus such as chromaticism, counterpoint, learning to play in different keys, or using each hand independently. Her works were published by Oliver Ditson Co., Willis Music, Harold Flammer Inc, Belwin Inc, and R. D. Row. They were also published in Braille and made available through the Library of Congress National Library Service for the Blind and Print Disabled.

Her compositions include:

Orchestra 

Concerto for Two Pianos

Piano 

Bachette

By the Little Mill

Carefree

Fun with a Hoop

Gay Caprice

Happitat

Hop Along My Little Froggie

In the Chapel

Introduction and Sonatina

Just Before Dawn

Little Prelude

Merrily Over the Waves We Go

Musical Moods in All Keys

Musical Playmates

Now It's Time to Run and Play

O So Happy
Old Cowboy Trail

On Swan Lake

Puppet Mischief

Rhapsody

Scampering Whole Steps

Scherzino

Vocal 

“I Wonder Where the Robins Go?” (words by Margaret Wigham and Wilma Wigham)

References 

American women composers
1972 deaths
1904 births
Compositions for piano
People from Minnesota